This list of tallest buildings in Croatia ranks buildings in Croatia by official height.

The tallest structure in Croatia is the  chimney of the Plomin Power Station in Plomin, Istria. The tallest Croatian skyscraper is Dalmatia Tower in Split. One of the most popular skyscrapers in Zagreb is Neboder - Ilica 1, it was renovated in 2006 but originally was completed in 1958.

Tallest buildings 

Under construction, approved, proposed
This list contains tallest buildings in Croatia which are under construction, approved or proposed since 2017.

Approved

Proposed

Timeline of tallest buildings
This lists buildings that once held the title of tallest building in Zagreb.

Cities with the most skyscrapers

This table shows Croatian cities with at least one skyscraper over 100 metres in height, completed.

References

External links
 Croatia Page on Emporis.com
 Diagram of Croatia buildings on SkyscraperPage

Croatia

Tallest
Croatia